Fandango is a country music-themed quiz show which aired on The Nashville Network from March 8, 1983 to August 26, 1988, with reruns airing through March 31, 1989, when it was replaced by Top Card. Fandango was the first TV game show to air on TNN and was one of the longest-running game shows on a cable network.

The show was hosted by singer Bill Anderson, who was joined by Blake Pickett as co-host in 1987. Radio and television personality Charlie Chase has often been identified as the voice of "Edgar the Talking Jukebox", but Anderson's autobiography Whisperin' Bill names Edgar's voice as being that of Anderson's long-time friend, radio announcer Bill Robinson.

Gameplay

Main game
Three contestants (including a returning champion) answered country music questions to win prizes. The returning champion stood behind the blue podium and his/her two challengers stood at red and yellow podiums.

1983
In round one, Anderson asked a toss-up question to all three contestants worth 10 points. Whoever buzzed-in with the right answer wagered any or all of his/her score and chose one of nine categories.  The center category was always the "Star of the Day". A correct answer added the wager to his/her score and a wrong answer deducted it. Later in the run, a "Secret Square" was shown to the home audience, and if chosen, it would double the wager for a correct answer. Gameplay continued until time expired or until all nine categories were used. In round two, toss-ups were worth 20 points but overall gameplay remained the same.

Some questions had a bonus prize attached to it, which Edgar would mention prior to the question.

1987
The game started with a 10-point toss-up question. The first contestant to buzz-in and answer correctly won the points and chose from one of eight categories for bonus points, worth anywhere from 20–100 points. If the contestant answered the bonus question correctly, he/she won the points. If the contestant was incorrect, whichever opponent currently had the lower score had a chance to answer and steal the points. If the contestant with the lowest score missed, the third contestant was given a chance to respond. If the two opponents were tied, the question became a toss-up between them. Round two was played the same way as round one, except that the point values were now doubled.

In the middle of each round, Edgar the Talking Jukebox would interrupt the game, usually with a joke, and then announce a bonus prize, to be awarded to the contestant who answered the next question correctly.

Final Question
Each round ended with one final question. Originally, it was played for 50 points in both rounds, and all three contestants answered by writing their response on a card. In the second round, 50 points was taken away for a wrong answer. Starting in 1987, if the difference was less than 200 points between two or all three contestants, the final question was worth +/- 100 points. If a contestant led by more than 200 points, the final question was not played since the difference wasn't enough to catch the leader.

The champion went to whoever had the highest score at the end of the game, won a prize and advanced to the bonus round. If the game ended in a tie, one final toss-up question was asked. If a contestant at least 1,000 points in the first four seasons, the podium would read 999, but Bill would tell the contestant's actual score, as the scoreboards in the first four seasons could only display three digits. However in 1987, the scoreboards displayed four digits.

Bonus Round ("Meet the Stars")
In the bonus round, the champion tried to predict celebrities' answers given in pre-taped interviews. Originally, the Star of the Day was the only celebrity featured in the interviews, but beginning in 1987, four different celebrities were featured.

Anderson read a question (e.g., "When you do a concert or an on-stage performance, what song is most requested by the audience?") with two possible answers, and the contestant guessed what answer the celebrity gave. For each correct answer, the contestant won an increasingly valuable prize. If incorrect, the game ended, and the contestant lost all prizes accumulated to that point; however, the contestant could quit at any time and keep what he/she had already won. If the contestant answered all four questions correctly, he/she won the grand prize of a vacation. If the contestant missed the first question, he/she could still win the first prize by answering the question from the second celebrity (no additional prizes could be won), but if they missed the second question, the round ended in a loss, and the contestant was awarded a consolation prize.

Beginning in 1987, the champion was shown an eight-numbered board from which he/she selected prizes for the first three questions. For the fourth question, Pickett presented eight sealed envelopes containing the names of different grand prizes, which included cars, a boat, a fur coat, and vacations. After choosing an envelope, the contestant could elect to risk what he/she had already won in order to win the bonus prize by opening the envelope and revealing the grand prize, or return the envelope and select a fourth prize from the board without having to answer an additional question. Any contestant who won the grand prize retired from the show. If a contestant won five consecutive days, he/she was automatically awarded the grand prize regardless of the outcome of the bonus round.

In some cases, Anderson would participate as the Star of the Day, during which Edgar would host the bonus round.  In other cases, during celebrity shows with country music stars, the round was reversed, and the stars would guess what the former contestants responded to various questions.  The fans involved won prizes based on how well the star had done in the round.  Beginning in 1987, a variety of different stars (which included then-current country stars, country music legends, country-oriented comedians and stars from popular Nashville Network shows) played the bonus round, and Anderson would tell the contestant the star's name to help him or her decide whether to continue or stop.

For at least the first two seasons, the show had a celebrity tournament with country stars playing. The show donated a cash prize to charity on each celeb's behalf. The winner of the maingame played the bonus and the prizes went to a civilian, in some cases a former contestant. The winners of the first three games came back on day four for the finals. Johnny Russell won at least the first two years of the tourney

External links
 Fandango at imdb.com

References

Musical game shows
1980s American game shows
1983 American television series debuts
1989 American television series endings
The Nashville Network original programming